Anania funebris is a species of moth of the family Crambidae. Its common name is the White-spotted Sable. It is found in Europe, Siberia, the Northern parts of  the Far East and North America.

The wingspan is 20–23 mm (0.79-0.92 in). 
The forewings are black; a large round white subdorsal spot before middle, and a second in disc beyond middle; sometimes a white dot above first; cilia white towards tips. Hindwings as forewings, but without the white dot. The larva is ochreous-whitish; dorsal line deep green; subdorsal and lateral green; spiracular whitish-green; dots green; head whitish-brown.

The moth flies from June to July depending on the location.

The larvae feed on Solidago virgaurea.

References

External links 
 UK Moths
 Lepidoptera of Belgium
 Microlepidoptera.nl 

Pyraustinae
Moths of Asia
Moths of Europe
Moths of North America
Moths described in 1768
Taxa named by Hans Strøm